Trechus guangaishanus is a species of ground beetle in the subfamily Trechinae. It was described by Belousov & Kabak in 2001.

References

guangaishanus
Beetles described in 2001